Per Edmund Mordt (born 25 March 1965) is a retired Norwegian football defender and midfielder.

Mordt was born in Arendal. During his club career, Mordt played for Kolbotn IL, Vålerenga IF, IFK Göteborg, SK Brann and Drøbak-Frogn IL. In 1986, at only 21 years of age, Mordt missed the vital penalty kick in the 1985–86 European Cup semi final after coming on as a substitute against FC Barcelona, resulting in the Catalans progressing to the final stage of the tournament at the expense of IFK Göteborg. He also amassed 31 caps for the Norwegian national team, scoring 1 goal.

References

External links
 
 

1965 births
Living people
Norwegian footballers
Norway international footballers
Olympic footballers of Norway
Footballers at the 1984 Summer Olympics
Association football defenders
Eliteserien players
Allsvenskan players
Vålerenga Fotball players
IFK Göteborg players
SK Brann players
Norwegian expatriate footballers
Norwegian expatriate sportspeople in Sweden
Drøbak-Frogn IL players
Expatriate footballers in Sweden
UEFA Cup winning players
People from Arendal
Sportspeople from Agder